Anthony William Dale, known as Tony Dale (born 1969) is a businessman from suburban Cedar Park, Texas, who is a Republican former member of the Texas House of Representatives from District 136.

First elected in 2012, Dale was reelected to successive two-year terms in 2014 and 2016.  House District 136 consists of the Williamson County portion of Austin, the City of Cedar Park, the City of Leander, North Austin MUD #1 (Rattan Creek), Block House Creek MUD, Brushy Creek MUD, Fern Bluff MUD and a small portion of Round Rock.

Background

Dale received a Bachelor of Arts degree in Political Science from Ohio State University at Columbus in central Ohio. While at Ohio State, he was active in partisan politics and for a time was President of the Ohio State University College Republican Club and the state co-chairman of the Ohio College Republican Federation.  He also worked at the Ohio Republican Party for four years as a college intern.

Texas Adjutant General's Individual Award, Texas State Guard Service Medal, Texas Cold War Service Medal, Texas Humanitarian Relief Ribbon, Commanding General's Individual Award (second award), Texas Faithful Service Medal, Texas State Guard Commendation Medal, Texas State Guard Achievement Medal, Texas State Guard Officer Professional Education Ribbon, State Guard Association of the United States Professional Development Medal, State Guard Association of the United States Meritorious Unit Award, Master Military Emergency Management Specialist Badge and Expert Marksman Badge and The Noble Patron of Armor Award. Dale is a charter member of the Hunter-Morris Memorial American Legion Post 911 in Cedar Park. Mrs. Dale was the 2014-2015 post commander. He is a Colonel in the Texas State Guard where he serves as the Director of the Civil Affairs Operations Section at Headquarters, Camp Mabry. In 2021 he was inducted into the Ohio State University Army ROTC Society Hall of Fame.

The former owner of a consulting company, Dale is a member of the Cedar Park Chamber of Commerce. 
In 2020, Mary Lopez Dale was appointed by Governor Greg Abbott as a member of the Texas Veterans Commission. She is the past Chair of the Williamson County United Way. The Dales have been married over 30 years and they have two daughters. One is graduate of Leander ISD schools and the other attends school at LISD. They attend St. Vincent de Paul Roman Catholic Church in Austin.

Political life

From 2002 until 2009 Dale served as a precinct chairman for the Williamson County Republican Party.  He also served in the capacity of election clerk and election judge.

From 2009 to 2012, Dale was a member of the Cedar Park City Council and for a year served as the mayor pro tem. Earlier, he was the secretary and later vice chairman of the Cedar Park Planning and Zoning Commission. As a member of the board of the Williamson County Conservation Foundation, he pushed for local control over federal regulations. He served too on the Cedar Park Charter Review Committee.

In 2014 Dale was unopposed in the Republican Primary.  In the November 4, 2014 Dale received 20,862 (54.2 percent) and out paced his closest opponent by 13.1 percent. Democratic nominee John Bucy of Austin received 15,821 (41.1 percent) and Libertarian nominee Justin Billiot of Cedar Park received 1,811 (4.7 percent).

In the 84th Legislative Session (2015-2016) Dale served on the house committees of (1) Homeland Security and Public Safety, (2) Energy Resources and (3) Local and Consent Calendar Committee.  In the 85th Legislative Session (2017-2018) Dale served on (1) Environmental Regulation Committee and (2) Vice Chairman of the Juvenile Justice & Family Issues Committee and (3) House Select Committee on Cybersecurity. He was appointed as a member of the House Working Group to reform the Child Protective Service.  He is a member of the House Working Group developing internal House policies on sexual harassment.  He is the Chairman of the House Energy Caucus.  In the 85th legislative session Dale served as Deputy Floor Leader for the Republican Caucus.  He is on the board of directors of the Texas Conservative Coalition.

The Cedar Park Chamber of Commerce named Dale the 2017 Citizen of the Year.  In 2018 Cedar Park Mayor Matt Powell presented Dale with the city's highest civilian honor by bestowing upon him a key to the city. In 2017, 2016, 2015 and 2013 the Hill Country News reader poll voted Dale the "Best Elected Official". The Texas Conservative Coalition, a bipartisan group of legislators, named him a "Courageous Conservative" following the 83rd, 84th and 85th regular sessions. After the 84th session the Texas Right To Life rated him a 100%.  The Combined Law Enforcement Associations of Texas (CLEAT) named him Freshman of the Year in 2013." Following the 84th legislative session in 2015 the Combined Law Enforcement Associations of Texas named him, "Best of the House". In 2015 he was elected to the Board of Directors of the Texas Conservative Coalition. In 2013 and 2015 the Texas Association of Business named him a "Champion For Free Enterprise". The Texas Alliance for Life PAC endorsed his reelection in 2015/2016.  In 2015 the Texas Conservative Roundtable named him an "Effective Conservative".

Prior to the 2011 Egyptian Revolution he traveled to Amman, Jordan to train pro-democracy Egyptians on grassroots campaign tactics. This training was conducted on behalf of the International Republican Institute.

Legislative positions

During the 84th Regular Legislative Session (2015) Dale filed legislation to award the Texas Purple Heart Medal to the Fort Hood shooting victims of terrorist Nidal Hasan on 11/5/2009 (HB115).  He also filed legislation to require the use of E-Verify by all state agencies and public universities (HB183) and require the use of E-Verify by state contractors and subcontractors (HB889).  Dale filed HB861 to facilitate the prosecution of adults who solicit minors online for illicit sexual purposes.

His 2015 84th legislative session accomplishments also include: HB939 – Allows homeowners in HOAs to install standby generators. HB1446 – Allows sexual assault victims and stalking victims to get reimbursed by the crime victims fund.   HB 1447 – streamlines protective orders for victims of sexual abuse, assault, stalking and trafficking.  HB2604- Reduces red tape for police officers applying for a concealed handgun license (CHL). HB4030 – Requires a complete background check prior to starting work as a private security licensee.

In the 84th session he also jointly authored of co-authored the following successful legislation: HB114 – Restricts the use of Capital Appreciation Bonds. HB505 – Removes limits on the number of dual-credit courses high school students may take. HB1286 – Enhanced penalties for injury to a child, elderly individual or disable person. HB1293 – Allows stalking victims to have confidentiality in court proceedings. HB1783 – Requires schools to reports crimes to police and not coerce employees to not report crimes. HB2339 – Allows customers to carry alcoholic beverages throughout all areas inside stadiums and arenas.

During the 85th session (2017) Dale authored legislation to target the teachers having inappropriate relationships with students.  He authored additional child protection measures such as HB 1810 that allows for the prosecution of criminals possessing and publishing lewd visual images of children.  He also passed legislation targeting online predators who blackmail individuals online using intimate images and videos.  This crime known as 'sextortion" is a growing concern as reported by the National Center For Missing and Exploited Children".  The Speaker of the House appointed Dale to the House Working Group on Child Protective Service Reform.  In that capacity Dale worked on legislation to transform and improve Texas' challenged child welfare system.

Interest group ratings

The Texas Association of Business scored him 93 percent for the 83rd session. The National Rifle Association scored Dale 92 percent following the 83rd session. Following the 84th session Texas Right to Life noted his score of 100%.  Americans for Prosperity named him a Lone Star Leader with an A rating. Dale was in the top 24 most conservative House Members on Rice University Professor Mark Jones' 2017 Liberal-Conservative Ranking and Score of Texas House of Representatives.

Third term election in 2016

Dale won his third term in the House in the general election held on November 8, 2016. With 41,643 votes (55 percent), he defeated the Democrat Paul R. Gordon, who polled 34,077 (45 percent).

2018 general election
Dale lost his bid for a fourth term in the general election held on November 6, 2018. He was unseated by the Democrat John Bucy III, who had lost the 2014 election to Dale: 41,485 votes (53.3) to 34,031 (43.8 percent). The Libertarian Party choice, Zack Parks, held another 2,253 (2.9 percent).

References

 

1969 births
Living people
Businesspeople from Texas
Texas city council members
Republican Party members of the Texas House of Representatives
People from Lorain County, Ohio
People from Cedar Park, Texas
Ohio State University College of Arts and Sciences alumni
United States Army officers
21st-century American politicians
Catholics from Texas
Catholics from Ohio
Military personnel from Texas